Johan Høstmælingen (born November 16, 1971 in Lillehammer) is a Norwegian curler.

At the national level, he is a four-time Norwegian men's champion curler (1998, 2000, 2003, 2004).

Teams

References

External links

 Video: 

Living people
1971 births
Sportspeople from Oslo
Sportspeople from Lillehammer
Norwegian male curlers
Norwegian curling champions
21st-century Norwegian people